Thomas Allen (1803–1833) was an English topographer.

Allen was the son of a map engraver. He died of cholera on 7 July 1833.

Works
In 1827 Allen published a quarto volume, The History and Antiquities of the Parish of Lambeth and the Archiepiscopal Palace, with illustrations, mainly drawn and etched by himself. He later published:

 in parts, the History and Antiquities of London, Westminster, and Southwark (1827 and 1828), illustrated by engravings on copper by himself and woodcuts; 
 A New and Complete History of the County of York (1828 to 1831), with engravings after Nathaniel Whittock; 
History of the Counties of Surrey and Sussex (1829 to 1830), with engravings after Whittock;

and he began in 1830 a History of the County of Lincoln, with engravings after his own drawings, which was completed after his death and published in 1834.

Allen also published guide-books to London and the Zoological Gardens, contributed some plates and articles to the Gentleman's Magazine, and projected A Historical and Topographical Atlas of England and Wales, which he did not live to attempt.

References

Attribution

1803 births
1833 deaths
English topographers
19th-century English writers
English etchers
Deaths from cholera
Place of birth missing